The 1936 NFL season was the 17th regular season of the National Football League. For the first time since the league was founded, there were no team transactions (neither a club folded nor did a new one join the NFL), and all league teams played the same number of games.

Since this season, the number of scheduled regular season games per team has been:
12 in 1936
11 from 1937 to 1942 and in 1946
10 from 1943 to 1945
12 from 1947 to 1960
14 from 1961 to 1977
16 from 1978 to 2020
17 since 2021

1936 was also the third season of the NFL's 12-year ban on black players.

The season ended when the Green Bay Packers defeated the Boston Redskins in the NFL Championship Game at the Polo Grounds in New York City, the first NFL title game to be held at a neutral venue.

This is also the only time in NFL history that a team declined home field advantage and elected to play at a neutral site: while the Eastern Division champion Redskins were the home team, franchise owner George Preston Marshall, the Packers, and the League mutually agreed to move the game from Fenway Park due to low ticket sales in Boston.

Draft
The 1936 NFL Draft, the first ever draft held by the NFL, was held on February 8, 1936 at Philadelphia's Ritz-Carlton Hotel. With the first pick, the Philadelphia Eagles selected halfback Jay Berwanger from the University of Chicago.

Major rule changes
A draft shall be held to assign all new players entering the league for the first time to teams in an arbitrary and equitable manner.
The penalty for an illegal forward pass that is thrown beyond the line of scrimmage is five yards from the spot of the foul.

Division races
In the Western Division, the Bears were 6–0 and the Packers were 5–1 midway through the 12 game season, with the Packers' only loss having been a 30–3 blowout against Chicago.

On November 1, Green Bay beat the Bears 21–10 to give both teams a 6–1 record. Both teams continued to win, and both were 9–1 as Thanksgiving approached. The Bears lost their last two games, while Green Bay won both, thus putting the Packers into the Championship Game.  

In the Eastern Division, the Pittsburgh Pirates were at 6–5 and the Boston Redskins at 5–5 when they met on November 29 in Boston before a crowd of only 7,000. The Pirates lost 30–0, leaving 6–5 Boston and the 5–5–1 New York Giants as the remaining contenders. Boston and New York finished the season by playing each other on December 6, with the Redskins winning 14–0 before 18,000 spectators in the Polo Grounds. 

The Eastern winner had the right to host the 1936 title game, but due to low attendance in Boston, George Preston Marshall, the Packers and the League mutually agreed to move the Championship Game to New York, where 29,545 turned out. Marshall would subsequently move the Redskins to Washington in 1937.

Final standings

NFL Championship Game

Green Bay 21, Boston 6, at Polo Grounds, New York City, December 13, 1936

League leaders

Coaching changes
Boston Redskins: Eddie Casey was replaced by Ray Flaherty.
Philadelphia Eagles: Lud Wray was replaced by Bert Bell.

Stadium changes
The Philadelphia Eagles moved from the Baker Bowl to Philadelphia Municipal Stadium

See also
 1936 American Football League season

References
 NFL Record and Fact Book
 NFL History 1931–1940 (Last accessed December 4, 2005)
 Total Football: The Official Encyclopedia of the National Football League

National Football League seasons